Kala is a fictional character appearing in American comic books published by Marvel Comics.

Publication history 
She first appeared in Tales of Suspense #43 and was created by Stan Lee, Robert Bernstein, and Jack Kirby.

Fictional character biography
Kala is the Queen of the Netherworld, which is another name for the city of Netheria. Netheria was once a city on the continent of Atlantis, which was enclosed in an airtight dome to protect itself from the Deviant empire based in Lemuria. The people excavated the foundations beneath the city to expand it below the ground, and discovered a way to recycle their air supply. When Atlantis sank in the great cataclysm, Netheria remained intact. Netheria sank to the bottom of the sea and further through it every year, in a huge cavern beneath the floor of the Atlantic Ocean, in part of what is now known as Subterranea. Its people renamed their kingdom the Netherworld, and themselves Netherworlders. Queen Kala sought to use her armies and highly advanced weaponry to conquer the surface world, and sought a means to transport them to the surface. Tony Stark became encased in a crystalline substance that sank into the Earth, transporting him to the Netherworld, after a guard and a scientist were teleported before him. Kala demanded that Stark create a means for her to bring her armies to the surface or else she would execute him and his two friends. It is revealed her General Baxu loves her due to her beauty, though he hates taking orders from a woman. Stark claimed he would help her, but needed a lab and solitude, which he was granted. Stark instead used the Netherworlders' laboratories to create a duplicate of his Iron Man armor and claimed Stark escaped and summoned him, using the armor to defeat the armies, capture Kala and fly to the surface. Exposure to the surface world's air caused Kala to age rapidly into an elderly state. Realizing that her people could not live on the surface world, she renounced her plans of conquest, and was returned to the Netherworld where she regained her youth.

Kala then planned to gain control of the Mole Man's realm in Subterranea by pretending to fall in love with him. Mole Man had captured his greatest rival for rulership, Tyrannus, and Kala actually fell in love with Tyrannus instead.

Kala next appeared in Fantastic Four #127 where she first met the Thing, who "saved" her from a creature called the Kraawl -- or at least he thought he did. In this scene, Thing beat up a giant worm he thought had been attacking Kala when really, the Kraawl was Kala's pet which she was using to travel to Subterranea. The thing is, the only one who can control the Kraawls is Kala, and in order to do so she must sing to them. Kala explains to Ben Grimm that she is journeying to meet Mole Man and that she must marry him in order to preserve Netherworld, descendants of the "once mighty Atlantis". Thing agrees to journey to Subterranea to escort Kala to Mole Man, but quickly discovers that the two had been plotting to destroy the world above. Eventually, Kala betrays Mole Man but she is still evil and Mole Man is still in love with her.

Queen Kala freed Tyrannus from the Mole Man's control, and the Mole Man was crushed to find that she had deceived and betrayed him.  She teamed with Tyrannus in capturing the Mole Man, and planned to destroy surface civilization with molten lava.  Kala planned to rule the entire realm with Tyrannus, but Tyrannus turned against her and imprisoned her, though she later regained her freedom. The Fantastic Four show up in Fantastic Four #128 and save the day. Tyrannus turned against Kala and imprisoned her within energy rings, since he had no intention of sharing rulership of Subterranea with anyone. Tyrannus was temporarily incapacitated by an explosion, and the Mole Man and Kala regained their freedom, but Kala and the heart-broken Mole Man parted, and she returned to her Netherworld kingdom.

She then went to war against the Mole Man, and once again grew elderly on exposure to the air of the surface world. However, after having been spurned by Tyrannus, she became the Mole Man's consort out of desperation.

Much later, Kala went to the surface world in search of Stark and Iron Man, and asked Stark to send Iron Man to help the Mole Man against Brutus and the Deviants. She was returned to Subterranea by the Outcasts. Kala then asked the Avengers West Coast's aid for the Mole Man against Brutus. She was wounded saving the Mole Man's life and was reconciled with the Mole Man.

Powers and abilities
Kala is actually centuries old, but remained a beautiful, robust young woman, until recent times due to the unexplained atmospheric effect in subterranean "Netherworld". For unknown reasons, exposure to the Earth's atmosphere causes her to grow old and weak within moments. Only Netherworld air or Tyrannus's Fountain of Youth can restore Kala's physical prime. She was educated by the Netherian royal tutors and is also a charismatic ruler, cunning military strategist, and efficient administrator. During her life underground, she can see clearly in far dimmer light than most surface people. As the Netherworld  queen, Kala has access to its armies, as well as various vehicles and energy weapons.

References

External links
 

Characters created by Jack Kirby
Characters created by Robert Bernstein
Characters created by Stan Lee
Comics characters introduced in 1963
Fictional characters with slowed ageing
Fictional characters with superhuman senses
Fictional military strategists
Fictional queens
Marvel Comics Atlanteans (pre-cataclysm)
Marvel Comics female supervillains